El Kilo is the third album by Orishas, a Cuban hip hop group based in France. It was released on March 29, 2005, on the Universal Latino Label.

Track listing

"Nací Orishas" - 4:53
"Distinto" - 4:04
"Elegante" - 3:59
"El Kilo" - 4:26
"Que Se Bote" - 4:14
"Reina De La Calle" - 4:24
"Bombo" - 3:31
"Al Que Le Guste" - 4:25
"Amor Al Arte" - 4:05
"Tumbando Y Dando" - 3:12
"La Calle" - 3:27
"Stress" - 4:04
"La Vacuna" - 4:06
"Quien Te Dijo" - 3:04

Charts

Weekly charts

Year-end charts

References

Orishas (band) albums
2005 albums